Edit Perényi-Weckinger (5 May 1923 – 1 February 2019) was a Hungarian gymnast who competed in the 1948 Summer Olympics and in the 1952 Summer Olympics. She was born in Kispest.

At the London Olympics in 1948, she won silver in the team competition, after the Czechs and ahead of the Americans. In 1952, she participated in the Helsinki Olympics, winning the silver medal in the team competition - after the Soviets and ahead of the Czechoslovakia - and the bronze in the team competition with equipment (a modality similar to the current rhythmic gymnastics), being located in the podium after the Swedes and the Soviets.

References

1923 births
2019 deaths
Hungarian female artistic gymnasts
Olympic gymnasts of Hungary
Gymnasts at the 1948 Summer Olympics
Gymnasts at the 1952 Summer Olympics
Olympic silver medalists for Hungary
Olympic bronze medalists for Hungary
Olympic medalists in gymnastics
Medalists at the 1952 Summer Olympics
Medalists at the 1948 Summer Olympics
Gymnasts from Budapest
20th-century Hungarian women
21st-century Hungarian women